EAE can refer to:

 EAE Business School, in Barcelona, Spain
 EAE Editorial Académica Española, a German publishing company
 Encyclopaedia Aethiopica, a reference work
 European Air Express, a defunct German airline
 Eusko Abertzale Ekintza, a Basque political party
 Evangelistic Association Of The East, an NGO founded in 1924 at Perumbavoor
 Experimental autoimmune encephalomyelitis
 Siwo Airport, in Vanuatu